The 1947 Hampton Pirates football team was an American football team that represented Hampton Institute in the Colored Intercollegiate Athletic Association (CIAA) during the 1947 college football season. In their third non-consecutive year under head coach James Griffin, the Pirates compiled a 7–2–1 record, lost to Florida A&M in the Orange Blossom Classic, and outscored opponents by a total of 107 to 63. Hampton ranked No. 4 among the nation's black college football teams according to the Pittsburgh Courier and its Dickinson Rating System.

Schedule

References

Hampton
Hampton Pirates football seasons
Hampton Pirates football